William "Bill" Kenneth Hastings was New Zealand's tenth Chief Censor. He held the position from October 1999 to July 2010. He was Chairperson of the Immigration and Protection Tribunal from July 2010 until February 2013, and is currently a District Court Judge. He was the chair of the Broadcasting Standards Authority from October 2018 until August 2021. He was sworn in as the tenth Judge of the Court Martial of New Zealand on 20 July 2021. On 9 August 2021, Hastings was sworn in as Chief Justice of the Republic of Kiribati.

Biography
Born in Scarborough, Ontario, Canada in 1957, he attended Lord Roberts Public School, and graduated from Midland Avenue Collegiate Institute. He holds a BA from the University of Trinity College, University of Toronto; law degrees from Osgoode Hall Law School, the London School of Economics, and Duke University; and was a practising barrister. He moved to New Zealand in 1985. Before becoming Chief Censor, he was Deputy and Acting Chief Censor from December 1998 to October 1999, Senior Lecturer in Law (teaching Legal System and International Law), Deputy Dean of Law, and a member of the governing Council, at Victoria University of Wellington. He was also the Video Recordings Authority in 1994, a member of the Indecent Publications Tribunal from 1990 to 1994 and Deputy President of the Film and Literature Board of Review from 1995 to 1998. In 2010 he stood down as Chief Censor when he became a District Court Judge and Chair of the Immigration and Protection Tribunal. He was succeeded as Chief Censor by Andrew Jack, whose doctoral work he had supervised.

Role as Chief Censor
In 1998, he was appointed Deputy Chief Censor at the Office of Film and Literature Classification by the Governor-General of New Zealand on the recommendation of the Jenny Shipley-led National coalition government. In 1999, he was appointed Chief Censor by the Governor-General on the recommendation of the Helen Clark-led Labour coalition government for a three-year term in 1999, a two-year term in 2002, another three-year term in 2004 and a third three-year term late in 2007.

In 2002, Hastings appeared in the public eye when he made censorship decisions on highly controversial films, particularly Baise-moi and Visitor Q, both of which were scheduled for screening at the Beck's Incredible Film Festival. In 2003, Hastings again appeared in the public eye when the computer game Manhunt was banned by his office, making its possession in New Zealand illegal. Following a meeting in Toronto on 22 December 2003 between Hastings and officials from the Ontario Ministry of Consumer and Business Services, Manhunt became the first computer game in Ontario to be classified as a film and restricted to adults in February 2004.

The Society for the Promotion of Community Standards in particular has accused Hastings of being a "gay activist" promoting homosexuality and promiscuity by giving too liberal classifications to films. This estimation is contradicted by examination of the appeals against classifications; the Film and Literature Board of Review found classifications too liberal in only 3.5% of cases under Hastings – in contrast to 27% under his predecessor, Kathryn Paterson – and has upheld 82% of OFLC decisions made under Hastings.

Apart from his professional role, some have taken issue with one aspect of his personal life in particular: Hastings is openly homosexual.

Judicial career
On 21 June 2010, Hastings was appointed a District Court Judge and Chair of the Immigration and Protection Tribunal. Hastings was sworn in at Wellington on 9 July 2010. In April 2013 he was succeeded as Chairperson of the Tribunal by Judge Carrie Wainwright and began sitting full-time as a District Court judge. 
From 2015 to 2021 he presided over the Special Circumstances Court in Wellington. The Special Circumstances Court is a therapeutic court aiming to address the underlying causes of offending, an approach that underpins the Te Ao Mārama vision of the New Zealand District Courts.

On 9 August 2021, Hastings was sworn in as Chief Justice of the Republic of Kiribati. Chief Justice Hastings was seconded from the District Court of New Zealand for a period of three and a half years. He is the first openly gay person to become a Chief Justice of any country.

On 11 November 2021, Chief Justice Hastings overturned the Kiribati government's attempt to limit the term of another Kiribati High Court judge, Justice Lambourne, declaring the Government's actions unconstitutional.

On 30 June 2022, just as he was about to hear an appeal relating to further actions by the Kiribati government with respect to Justice Lambourne, he was abruptly suspended from his functions of Chief Justice by order of the President of Kiribati Taneti Maamau, creating a constitutional crisis.

See also
Censorship in New Zealand

References

External links

 

Alumni of the London School of Economics
Canadian gay men
New Zealand gay men
Living people
20th-century New Zealand lawyers
Chief Censors of New Zealand
District Court of New Zealand judges
Canadian emigrants to New Zealand
People from Scarborough, Toronto
Trinity College (Canada) alumni
University of Toronto alumni
Academic staff of the Victoria University of Wellington
People from Wellington City
1957 births
21st-century Canadian LGBT people
21st-century New Zealand LGBT people
21st-century New Zealand lawyers
New Zealand judges on the courts of Kiribati